Nam Joo-hyuk (Korean: 남주혁; born February 22, 1994) is a South Korean model and actor. He began his career as a model, and appeared in several music videos before making his screen debut in 2014 with The Idle Mermaid.  He rose to prominence with his role in the television series Who Are You: School 2015 (2015), and has since became notable for his leading roles in Weightlifting Fairy Kim Bok-joo (2016), The Bride of Habaek (2017), The Light in Your Eyes (2019), The School Nurse Files (2020), Start Up (2020), and Twenty-Five Twenty-One (2022) . 

In 2021, Nam was featured in Forbes 30 Under 30 owing to his successful acting and modeling career.

Early life
Nam Joo-hyuk was born on February 22, 1994, in Busan, South Korea. During his studies in Gyeongnam Middle School, Nam dreamed of becoming a professional basketball player, hence he played on the basketball team for three years, however after sustaining an injury and later undergoing an operation, his basketball days soon came to an end.

After moving to Seoul, he won the contest Top Model which was sponsored by K-Plus. Soon after, Nam signed an exclusive contract under the modeling agency.

Career

2013–2014: YGKPlus and music video appearances
Nam debuted in 2013 as a model for the SONGZIO Homme 2014 S/S collection.

In 2014, he appeared in the music videos 200% and Give Love of fellow YG Entertainment artist Akdong Musician. Soon after, he made his acting debut as a supporting role in the tvN drama, The Idle Mermaid.

2015–2018: Rising popularity and big screen debut

Nam landed his first major role in KBS’s coming-of-age teen drama Who Are You: School 2015, in which he portrayed a high school student named Han Yi-an, who experiences growing pains such as a crush on a schoolmate and injuries affecting his swimming career.  He garnered attention with his appearance in the series, eventually winning several accolades including Best New Actor at the 4th APAN Star Awards and the Popularity Award at the 2015 KBS Drama Awards.

In 2016, he played supporting roles in college romance series Cheese in the Trap and historical drama Moon Lovers: Scarlet Heart Ryeo. The same year, Nam became a cast member in the variety show Three Meals a Day. He then starred in his second lead role in the youth sports drama Weightlifting Fairy Kim Bok-joo alongside Lee Sung-kyung, portraying a talented yet playful swimmer named Jung Joon-hyung. Nam's performance in the series received favorable reviews and garnered him more widespread recognition.

In 2017, he led tvN's fantasy romance series The Bride of Habaek opposite Shin Se-kyung, wherein he portrayed a narcissistic Water God in pursuit of his rightful throne. Then in 2018, Nam starred in the historical film The Great Battle, which marked his big screen debut. Nam received acclaim for his performance, with Yoon Mi-sik of The Korea Herald writing that he "delivers a rock-solid portrayal of a wavering youth who is unsure of what is right or wrong." His performance in the film led him to win Best New Actor accolades at the prestigious Blue Dragon Awards.

2019–present: Transition to more leading roles 
Nam starred in the fantasy romance drama The Light In Your Eyes alongside Han Ji-min and Kim Hye-ja in 2019, receiving positive reviews for his performance.

In 2020, Nam starred in Netflix's supernatural crime drama The School Nurse Files and in the tvN romance series Start-Up. The same year, Nam also starred in the romance film Josée, a remake of the 2003 Japanese film Josee, the Tiger and the Fish. The film reunites Nam with The Light In Your Eyes co-star Han Ji-min. With the success of The School Nurse Files and Start-Up, Nam was featured in Forbes' 30 Under 30 Asia list under the "Entertainment & Sports" category in 2021.

Nam then worked with Kim Tae-ri in leading the tvN drama Twenty-Five Twenty-One. The series, which tells the story of love between a man and a woman who met in the midst of the IMF crisis set in 1998, premiered in February 2022. He received favorable reviews for his performance in portraying the character Baek Yi-jin, with Korean media outlet OSEN referring to Nam as the "symbol of youth" as they commended his acting skills which created what is known as the "Joohyuk's Pain" syndrome. Writer Kim Bo-ra cited his "solid physique, warm-hearted visuals, and deep sensibility" which made him "look like a character in a teen comic." Kim adds, "[Nam's] affectionate warm voice and clear gaze make viewers’ hearts flutter and fall for Baek Yi-jin."

Nam starred in the film Remember, which was released theatrically on October 26, 2022. He played the role of a young man who helps an Alzheimer's patient commit revenge. His performance was described as one that was able to "show sympathy that transcends generations in a way only [Nam] can." 

Nam is set to star in a leading role for the drama Vigilante, based on the Naver webtoon of the same name drawn by Kim Gyu-san. He is set to portray a police college student who operates as the titular vigilante.

Other activities

Endorsements
In November 2017, Penshoppe signed Nam as the new model of the clothing brand and he became one of its brand ambassadors. On April 17, 2019, it was officially announced that Nam was chosen as the brand ambassador of Dior Men in Asia.

Philanthropy
On April 6, 2019, it was reported that Nam donated about 30 million won to the Hope Bridge Association of the National Disaster Relief for the victims of the Gangwon Province wildfire in South Korea. In February 2020, he donated 50 million won to the Daegu Social Welfare Community Chest to be used for quarantine supplies and medical support needed to prevent COVID-19.

Public image
On June 20, 2022, a netizen alleged that he was a former victim of bullying and Nam Joo-hyuk was the perpetrator of his bullying during his six years in middle school and high school, claiming that Nam was part of a group of bullies that harassed him. Nam's management company denied the allegations and stated that they were untrue, and announced that they would seek criminal complaints against the netizen. On June 28, another person made school bullying accusations against Nam which were again denied by his management. On July 5, Korean news outlet Dispatch published an article containing statements of 20 people: 2 high school teachers and 18 classmates of Nam, defending him against the allegations.

Personal life

Military service 
On October 17, 2022, it was reported that Nam would be enlisting in the military in December. The agency later confirmed that Nam was scheduled to serve in the mandatory military service in December but has not received an official summons. 

On January 31, 2023, it was confirmed that Nam will enlist in the Capital Defense Command Military Police Group as a military police officer riot squad on March 20, 2023.

Filmography

Film

Television series

Web series

Television show

Web shows

Music video appearances

Discography

Soundtrack appearances

Awards and nominations

Listicles

References

External links

 

1994 births
Living people
21st-century South Korean male actors
South Korean male models
South Korean male television actors
South Korean male film actors
South Korean television personalities
Male actors from Busan